Adriano Zabarelli, also known as Andrea Palladino or il Palladino (c. 1610–1680) was an Italian painter of the Baroque period. He was born  and active in Cortona, although he was a pupil of Pietro da Cortona in Rome.

References

1610s births
1680 deaths
People from Cortona
17th-century Italian painters
Italian male painters
Italian Baroque painters